Saint-Cyr-le-Gravelais is a commune in the Mayenne department in north-western France.

Geography
The river Oudon forms part of the commune's northern border.

See also
Communes of Mayenne

References

Saintcyrlegravelais